Lance Fitzgerald (1924-2018) was an Australian rugby league footballer who played in the 1950s.

Fitzgerald was graded from the St. George junior league in 1949 with immediate success.  Fitzgerald was a winger in the St. George Dragons Third Grade premiership winning team of 1949. and was a regular lower grade player until retiring in 1956. He played eight first grade games between 1952-1953.

Fitzgerald died on 29 September 2008.

References

St. George Dragons players
Australian rugby league players
Rugby league wingers
1924 births
2008 deaths